Clinton Truman Duffy (1898–1982) was the warden of San Quentin State Prison between 1940 and 1952. He was a prominent opponent of capital punishment.

Life
His father was a guard at San Quentin, he was raised on the prison grounds, and his wife's father was also a San Quentin guard.

The 1954 film Duffy of San Quentin tells his story as a warden. His accomplishments during his tenure as warden include:
 Elimination of corporal punishment
 Improvement of food services
 Establishment of vocational training 
 Founding of an Alcoholics Anonymous program
 Desegregation of the dining hall
 Creation of the first prisoner-developed radio programs inside a prison
 Inauguration of a prison newspaper
He was known to walk unarmed among the prisoners and to chat with them. Although he "supervised 90 executions during his tenure as warden", he opposed capital punishment.

After he left San Quentin, he worked for the state's parole board; in addition, he wrote books and gave lectures about capital punishment. He died in Walnut Creek, California, at the age of 84.

Works
 Duffy, Clinton T., and Dean Southern Jennings. The San Quentin Story. Garden City, NY: Doubleday, 1950.
 Duffy, Clinton T. 88 Men and 2 Women. Garden City, NY: Doubleday, 1962.
 Duffy, Clinton T., and Al Hirshberg. Sex and Crime. Garden City, NY: Doubleday, 1965.
 Duffy, Clinton T., and Eva Irene Linkletter. From Heroin to San Quentin. Morro Bay, CA: Java Books, 1977.

References

External links
A biography by William J. Duffy, Jr., a brother
A biography by Charles B. White, a lifelong friend
Speech delivered by Clinton T. Duffy to the Comstock Club of Sacramento, California 

1898 births
1982 deaths
San Quentin State Prison wardens